This is a list of firearms used in the Chaco War. The Chaco War was fought from 1932-1935 between Bolivia and Paraguay over control of the northern part of the Gran Chaco region (known as Chaco Boreal) of South America, which was thought to be rich in oil.

Many Bolivian weapons were captured by the Paraguayans.

Pistols
 Browning M1911: bought by Bolivia;
 FN 1903: most numerous pistol of Paraguay, bought from 1927;
 Colt 1903: Bought by Paraguay between 1927 and 1929
 Browning 1900:Popular sidearm with Paraguayan Officers
 Browning M1910: in Bolivian service;
 Luger Model 1906: bought by Bolivia from 1912;
 Mannlicher M1905: bought by Paraguay;
 Mauser C96: bought by Bolivia prior to the war;
 Smith & Wesson Military & Police;
 Walther PP: in Bolivian service.

Rifles
 Argentine Mauser Model 1891 (also known as Modelo 1895): bought by Bolivia;
 Argentine Mauser Model 1909: some covertly supplied to Paraguay;
 FN Model 30: bought by both sides;
 Haenel Model 1909 carbine: bought by Paraguay;
 Lee–Metford: in Paraguayan service since 1904;
 Mauser Model 1895 (Mauser Modelo Chileno): used by Paraguay;
 Mauser Model 1907: acquired by both Bolivia and Paraguay;
 Mauser Standardmodell rifle, supplied to both sides;
 Oviedo Model 1927, Spanish low-quality copy of the Mauser Model 1907 produced for Paraguay;
 Oerlikon SSG36: antitank rifle bought by Bolivia;
 Vetterli M1870/87/15:Bought by Paraguay
 Vz.24: bought in large numbers by Bolivia, many captured by the Paraguayans;
 vz. 33: used by Paraguay.

Submachine guns 
 Vollmer VMP-30: bought by Bolivia, small amounts bought by Paraguai  before the war and captured during it;
 Bergmann MP18: bought by Bolivia
 Bergmann/Haenel MP 28.II: bought by Bolivia, small amounts bought  and captured by Paraguay;
 Bergmann MP35: bought by Bolivia. There may be a confusion with the similar-looking MP 28;
 Sig Model 1920:Bought by Bolivia, some captured by Paraguay
 Steyr Solothurn S1-100: bought by Bolivia, some captured by Paraguay;
 Suomi KP/-26 and KP/-31: imported by Bolivia, in small numbers;
 Thompson submachine gun: dubious claim that a few have been imported by Paraguay, other sources explain some were bought by Bolivia
 ZK-383.

Machine guns
 Browning Commercial MG38 and MG40: bought by both Bolivia and Paraguay;
 Colt–Browning M1895:Bought in small numbers by Bolivia and Paraguay
 Lewis gun: used by Bolivia;
 Madsen machine gun: in service with both sides;
 Maxim Machinegun:Used by Bolivia and Paraguay
 Vickers machine gun (Types C, E and F): bought by Bolivia;some captured by Paraguay
 Vickers–Berthier light machine gun: bought by Bolivia;
 ZB vz. 26 and ZB vz. 30: bought by Bolivia.

See also 
 Aerial operations in the Chaco War
 Tank warfare in the Chaco War

References

Bibliography 
 
 
 
 

Chaco War